The Pond River is a  tributary of the Green River in western Kentucky in the United States.  Via the Green and Ohio rivers, it is part of the watershed of the Mississippi River.

At the common boundary of Christian, Hopkins and Muhlenberg counties, it collects the  West Fork Pond River. Upstream of this confluence, the Pond River has also been known as the East Fork Pond River.

See also
List of Kentucky rivers

References

Rivers of Kentucky
Rivers of Christian County, Kentucky
Rivers of Hopkins County, Kentucky
Rivers of McLean County, Kentucky
Rivers of Muhlenberg County, Kentucky
Rivers of Todd County, Kentucky
Green River (Kentucky)